Mashkino is a rural locality (a selo) in Bodeyevskoye Rural Settlement, Liskinsky District, Voronezh Oblast, Russia. The population was 173 as of 2010. There are 3 streets.

Geography 
Mashkino is located 29 km northwest of Liski (the district's administrative centre) by road. Drakino is the nearest rural locality.

References 

Rural localities in Liskinsky District